Viktorin Hallmayer (also Hallmayr; 5 September 18319 May 1872) was an Austrian composer and band conductor, best known as the author of the Marcia Trionfale, the first anthem of the Catholic Pontificate and of the Vatican City State.

Hallmayer was born in 1831 at Anthering. He composed the Marcia in 1857, when he was director of the band of the 47th Infantry Regiment of the Line (the Count Kinsky Regiment) stationed within the Papal States. He died in 1872 in Graz

References

Weblinks
Biography at Österreichisches Biographisches Lexikon ab 1815

Austrian male composers
Austrian composers
1831 births
1872 deaths
19th-century composers
19th-century male musicians